The Division of Darebin was an Australian Electoral Division in Victoria. The division was created in 1949, and was named for the Darebin Creek. It was located in the northern suburbs of Melbourne, including Heidelberg, Preston, Reservoir and Thornbury. It was a fairly safe seat for the Australian Labor Party.

The seat was abolished in 1969, and largely replaced by the current Division of Scullin.

Members

Election results

1949 establishments in Australia
Constituencies established in 1949
1969 disestablishments in Australia
Constituencies disestablished in 1969
Darebin